The Belton, Williamston and Easley Railroad was a Carolinian railroad company, chartered shortly after the end of the Reconstruction Era of the United States.

Creation
The Belton, Williamston and Easley Railroad was created by an act of the South Carolina General Assembly in 1878.

Name change
The following year (1879) its name was changed to the Atlantic and French Broad Valley Railroad Company of South Carolina.

See also
 Atlantic and French Broad Valley Railroad
 Carolina and Cumberland Gap Railway
 Carolina, Cumberland Gap and Chicago Railway
 Edgefield Branch Railroad
 Edgefield, Trenton and Aiken Railroad
 French Broad and Atlantic Railway

References

Defunct South Carolina railroads
Railway companies established in 1878
Railway companies disestablished in 1879